Cornufer exedrus is a species of frog in the family Ceratobatrachidae endemic to Papua New Guinea.  It has been observed between 1500 and 1700 meters above sea level in the Nakanai Mountains in Papua New Guinea.

This frog is smaller than other frogs in Cornufer.

References

Frogs of Asia
Amphibians described in 2018
Endemic fauna of Papua New Guinea
exedrus